Snow Dome is a mountain in the Karakoram range in the Chaprot Pass region of Gilgit–Baltistan of Pakistan. It lies to the southeast of Daintar Pass and north of Mehrbani Peak (5,639 m) which is in the Naltar Valley.

See also
 List of highest mountains

External links
 Northern Pakistan detailed placemarks in Google Earth

Mountains of Gilgit-Baltistan